Spice of Life is the third studio album by Canadian country music artist George Fox. It was released by Warner Music Canada on May 28, 1991. The album peaked at number 23 on the RPM Country Albums chart.

Track listing

Personnel
 Ted Alexander - keyboards
 Sam Bacco - percussion
 Stuart Duncan - fiddle
 Paul Franklin - lap steel guitar
 Garth Fundis - backing vocals
 John Gardner - drums
 Rob Hajacos - fiddle
 Jelly Roll Johnson - harmonica
 Jerry Martin - acoustic guitar, electric guitar
 Brent Mason - guitar 
 Russ Pahl - steel guitar, electric guitar, acoustic guitar
 Dave Pomeroy - bass guitar, electric upright bass
 Matt Rollings - piano
 John Wesley Ryles - backing vocals
 Pete Wasner - keyboards
 Biff Watson - acoustic guitar
 Dennis Wilson - backing vocals

Chart performance

References

External links
[ Spice of Life] at Allmusic

1991 albums
George Fox albums
Albums produced by Garth Fundis